The 2018 FIM CEV Moto3 Junior World Championship was the seventh CEV Moto3 season and the fifth under the FIM banner.

The season was marred by the death of Andreas Pérez, who died after an accident at the second race of the Catalunya round.

Calendar
The following races were scheduled to take place in 2018.

Entry list

Championship standings

Scoring system
Points are awarded to the top fifteen finishers. A rider has to finish the race to earn points.

Riders' championship

Constructors' championship

References

External links
 

2018
2018 in motorcycle sport